Amblyprora magnifica is a moth of the family Erebidae described by William Schaus and W. G. Clements in 1893. This species is found in the Democratic Republic of the Congo,  Sierra Leone and South Africa.

References

External links

Erebidae
Moths of Africa